The Kota Formation is a geological formation in India. The precise age of Kota Formation are uncertain, but it dates from the Early to Middle Jurassic, and is split into a Lower Member and Upper Member. The lower member is thought to be Hettangian-Pliensbachian. While the upper unit is thought to be Toarcian, but may possibly extend into the Aalenian. It conformably overlies the Dharmaram Formation which is Late Triassic to earliest Jurassic and is unconformably overlain by the Early Cretaceous Gangapur Formation. The lower member is approximately 100 m thick while the upper member is 490 m thick. Both subunits primarily consist of mudstone and sandstone, but near the base of the upper unit there  is a 20-30 metre thick succession of limestone deposited in a freshwater setting.

Fossil content

Vertebrates 
Indeterminate thyreophoran remains geographically present in Telangana State, India. These were given the name Andhrasaurus by Roman Ulansky in 2014.

Invertebrates

See also 
 List of dinosaur-bearing rock formations
 Toarcian turnover
 Toarcian formations
Marne di Monte Serrone, Italy
 Calcare di Sogno, Italy
 Sachrang Formation, Austria
 Posidonia Shale, Lagerstätte in Germany
 Ciechocinek Formation, Germany and Poland
 Krempachy Marl Formation, Poland and Slovakia
 Lava Formation, Lithuania
 Azilal Group, North Africa
 Whitby Mudstone, England
 Fernie Formation, Alberta and British Columbia
 Poker Chip Shale
 Whiteaves Formation, British Columbia
 Navajo Sandstone, Utah
 Los Molles Formation, Argentina
 Mawson Formation, Antarctica
 Kandreho Formation, Madagascar
 Cattamarra Coal Measures, Australia

References 

Geologic formations of India
Jurassic System of Asia
Jurassic India
Sinemurian Stage
Pliensbachian Stage
Toarcian Stage
Hettangian Stage
Mudstone formations
Limestone formations
Sandstone formations
Lagoonal deposits
Fossiliferous stratigraphic units of Asia
Paleontology in India
Formations